Hikayat Hang Tuah (Jawi: حکاية هڠ تواه) is a Malay work of literature that tells the tale of the legendary Malay warrior, Hang Tuah and his four warrior friends - Hang Jebat, Hang Kasturi, Hang Lekir and Hang Lekiu – who lived during the height of the Sultanate of Malacca in the 15th century. The author is unknown, however, it has been accepted that it was written and rewritten by several different authors from different time periods in history with the aim to improvise the tale to fit the society at that certain period of time.

Story
The most memorable chapter in the work concerns a duel between Hang Tuah and his closest friend, Hang Jebat. Hang Tuah was falsely accused of adultery with one of his king's maids by his jealous rivals. Upon hearing the accusation, the king ordered Hang Tuah killed, without further investigation of the alleged offense. Hang Tuah was secretly saved, however, by his executioner, the Bendahara.

Hang Jebat was aware that Hang Tuah was being unjustly punished and in a show of support and deep loyalty for his friend, revolted against the sultan. The sultan's forces were unable to suppress Hang Jebat.

The sultan later came to realize that Hang Tuah was innocent, and immediately regretted sentencing Hang Tuah to death. The Bendahara then told the sultan that Hang Tuah was still alive, and that only Hang Tuah could suppress Hang Jebat's rebellion. Hang Tuah was immediately recalled and given amnesty. After seven days of fighting, Hang Tuah managed to kill Hang Jebat.

However, according to the Malay Annals, it was Hang Kasturi that fought with Hang Tuah instead of Hang Jebat.

Significance and controversies
Malay culture holds the Hang Tuah legends in extremely high regard. In fact, one of the hottest debates in Malay literature centers on the duel between Hang Tuah and Hang Jebat. Hang Tuah is a symbol of absolute loyalty to a ruler while Hang Jebat symbolizes freedom and justice. Hence, there is the question of who is right. Though it is generally perceived that there were five friends, there is doubt that Hang Lekir and Hang Lekiu are indeed two different persons. In the Jawi script, the letter "ﺭ" (ra) and the letter "ﻭ" (wow) look similar and those were part of the nouns "Leki-r" and "Leki-u". Due to the similarity, the differentiation of Lekir and Lekiu might be due to mistranslation. Many historians and literature experts disagree however, and point out that the five friends are a Malay version of the five warriors of Lord Krishna from the Mahabharata.

Apart from that, Hikayat Hang Tuah is highly critical of the Javanese and deals with the rivalry between the Malay Sultanate of Malacca and the Javanese Majapahit Empire. In the literary work, many of the crooks and the villains were from Majapahit or Java. The king of Majapahit is depicted as an indecisive person and Majapahit's grand vizier, Gajah Mada, as sly, cunning and unsympathetic. The text is believed dated since 1700, the manuscript was dated in 1849. Hikayat Hang Tuah was first published by the Methodist Publishing House, Singapore in 1908, edited by Sulaiman bin Muhammed Nur and William Shellabear.

Hikayat Hang Tuah was listed in UNESCO's Memory of the World Programme International Register in 2001.

See also
 Legend of Puteri Gunung Ledang
 Puteri Gunong Ledang, 1961 film
 Puteri Gunung Ledang, 2004 film
 Puteri Gunung Ledang (musical), musical based on the 2004 film
 List of Hikayat

References

External links
 Hikayat Hang Tuah pdf file from MyManuskrip (Jawi script)
 Another Hikayat Hang Tuah pdf file from MyManuskrip (Jawi script)

History of Malaysia
Malay-language literature
Indonesian literature
Malay folklore
Memory of the World Register
Works of unknown authorship